Akanlu (also Romanized as Akanlū and Akenlū; also known as Akanlao and Akūnlū) is a village in Mehraban-e Olya Rural District, Shirin Su District, Kabudarahang County, Hamadan Province, Iran. At the 2006 census, its population was 1,487, in 334 families.

Meaning of the word "Akanlu" 

In the Dehkhoda dictionary, "Akan" (Turkish) means cultivate’ and the suffix "Lu" denotes a place. Accordingly, Akanlu is a Turkish word meaning farmland.

Geographical location of Akanlu 

Akanlu village is located 365 kilometers from Tehran, 138 km from the city of Hamadan and 73 km from Kabudar-Ahang. To get to Akanlu from Tehran, take the Saveh Highway towards Hamadan and exit at Famenin. Pass Kabudrahang and Shirin Su. Akanlu lies about 32 km after Shirin Su.

General information about Akanlu  village has 536 households and a population of over 1,890. Taking advantage of the many water resources (aqueducts and springs) and the lush countryside with old-growth trees, vineyards and grasslands, most of the villagers are engaged in farming, animal husbandry, horticulture and forestry.

Tourist attractions near Akanlu 

Pasteur Institute a branch of  Pasteur Institute of Paris.A square and street named Prof. Marcel Baltazard a French physician and medical researcher. Known for his work on plague and rabies, he was the director of the Pasteur Institute of Iran from 1946 to 1961[2] and then head of the service of epidemiology in the Pasteur Institute of Paris.
Birthplace of Musa Hakimi a well known traditional physician.
Tourist attractions such as Alisadr and Katale Khor caves, the Shirin Su wetlands and the Lalejin pottery works are a short distance from the village.

References 

Populated places in Kabudarahang County